The Ministry of Tourism of Egypt was a part of the Cabinet of Egypt and was responsible for tourism in Egypt. On 14 January 2018, Rania Al-Mashat was appointed Minister of Tourism until December 2019. The Ministry of Tourism then merged with the Ministry of Antiquities with The Minister of Antiquities, Khaled al-Anani becoming the minister of the merged ministry: Ministry of Tourism and Antiquities.

History
Tourism is one of the most important sectors in Egypt's economy. More than 12.8 million tourists visited Egypt in 2008, providing revenues of nearly $11 billion. In 2009, the sector employed about 12 percent of Egypt's workforce.

In 2016, the minister of tourism expressed his concern and optimism about tourists returning to Egypt, despite the downing of a Russian flight in 2015. The minister has said "we are all in this together," referring to terrorism that hurts a country's tourism industry.

In 2018, the UAE Minister of Happiness met with the Egyptian Minister of Tourism to discuss the philosophy of making tourists happy.

In May 2018, the last chariot belonging to King Tut was escorted with a parade to the Grand Egyptian Museum (GEM). It is hoped that the investment in this new museum will stimulate more tourism to Egypt.

Tourism promotion
Before 2018, the promotion campaign was called This is Egypt.
In September 2018, Egypt went with a local advertising company called Synergy Advertising for their tourism promotion.

Ministers
 Hisham Zazou, appointed in 2015 
 Mohamed Yehia Rashed, appointed in 2016 
 Rania Al-Mashat, appointed in 2018

See also

 Cabinet of Egypt
 Grand Egyptian Museum

References

External links
Egypt's Cabinet Database

Tourism
Egypt